Irish Centre Party may refer to:
 Irish Centre Party (1919)
 National Centre Party (Ireland) (1932–33)